Grzegorz Halama (born 2 January 1970 in Świdwin) is a Polish parodist, and cabaret actor. In 1995 he initiated Grzegorz Halama Oklasky, a Polish cabaret. He is a graduate of technikum elektryczno-elektroniczne (Electrical-electronic Technical College) and actor study L'Art Studio in Kraków.

Actor merchandise

Movies

 1997: Robin Hood - czwarta strzała – rich person
 1999: Sprawa honoru
 1999: Dr Jekyll i mr Hyde według wytwórni A'Yoy – man in cabaret "Biedronka"
 2000: Umiesz tak?
 2000: W obronie kobiety
 2002: Nakręceni – Bogdan
 2002: Taki los
 2005: Kolska
 2008: Nie kłam kochanie - Iza's Husband
 2009: Gwiazdy w czerni - astronomer
 2010: Polskie gówno - Czesław Skandal

TV Theaters

 2003: Pielgrzymi – driver

Dubbing

 2004: RRRrrrr!!! – Zapowiadacz Nocy
 2005: Emilia - narrator
 2007: 7 krasnoludków: Las to za mało - historia jeszcze prawdziwsza – dwarf Knedel
 2007: Było sobie porno – various voices

Series
 2005–2009: Niania - pharmacist (episode 86 Wszystko zostaje w rodzinie, episode Teges-smeges (first episode of season 9), episode 103 Pechowa wysypka)
 2008–2009: 39 i pół - valet (season 2, episode 11)
 2010: Na dobre i na złe - hospitably, various roles: patient; policeman
 Spadkobiercy
 Since 13 March 2010: Tylko nas dwoje (Polish version of Just The Two of Us)

Movie director

 1999: Archetypowy ojciec
 1999: Sprawa honoru
 2000: Umiesz tak?
 2002: Hepi Lord
 2002: Taki los
 2002: Igry nocne
 2002: Choroba

Scenarist

 1999: Sprawa honoru
 1999: Archetypowy ojciec
 2000: Umiesz tak?

Photos

 2000: Umiesz tak?

Film editing

 2000: Umiesz tak?

TV programs

 2007–2008 Clever - widzisz i wiesz - professor
 Tylko nas dwoje

Parody songs

 Śpiworki (from this songs there is well-known citation in Polish: Ja wiedziałem, że tak będzie)

Radio programs

 Żule i bandziory - with Jarosław Jaros, in radio Trójka, every week at 8.48 in program Urywki Z Rozrywki. He plays Pan Józek, chickens breeder from Chociule.

Personal life 

Halama's girlfriend is Jania Dobosz. Earlier Grzegorz Halama was with his wife Dorota Halama, but they separated.

Grzegorz Halama has 2 children, daughter Anna and son Piotr.

References

External links
http://www.filmweb.pl/person/Grzegorz+Halama-132242

Polish male actors
Polish stand-up comedians
Living people
1970 births
People from Świdwin